Neale may refer to:
 Neale (surname)
 Neale, County Mayo
 Neale (electric car)

See also
 Neil, containing Neale as a given name